Anton Lens (28 November 1884 – 8 October 1955) was a Dutch international footballer who earned two caps for the national side in 1906. Lens played club football for HBS Craeyenhout between 1903 and 1909, scoring ten goals in 59 appearances.

External links
 Profile at VoetbalStats.nl

1884 births
1955 deaths
Dutch footballers
Netherlands international footballers
People from Batavia, Dutch East Indies
HBS Craeyenhout players
Association football midfielders